Le Parnasse contemporain ("The Contemporary Parnassus", e.g., the contemporary poetry scene) is composed of three volumes of poetry collections, published in 1866, 1871 and 1876 by the editor Alphonse Lemerre, which included a hundred  French poets, such as Leconte de Lisle, Théodore de Banville, Heredia, Gautier, Catulle Mendès, Baudelaire, Sully Prudhomme, Mallarmé, François Coppée, Charles Cros, Nina de Callias, Léon Dierx, Louis Ménard, Verlaine, Villiers de L'Isle-Adam and Anatole France.

The mid/late 19th century French literary movement Parnassianism took its name from the poetry collection. 

The first volume contained les Épaves and Nouvelles Fleurs du mal by Baudelaire, and early Mallarmé and Verlaine, avant-garde poets of the time. No poem by Arthur Rimbaud was included in any of the three volumes. Rimbaud is known to have read the first collection at a time when he was developing his poetry (sometime between 1866 and 1870). In a letter dated May 15, 1871 Rimbaud mentions by name dozens of poets who were included, referring to some of them as "idiots", "imbeciles", "schoolboys" et cetera. In that letter Rimbaud praises Charles Baudelaire, Theophile Gautier, Theodore de Banville, Leconte de Lisle, Albert Merat, and Paul Verlaine. He does not mention Mallarmé, who had 11 poems published in the 1866 collection.

Information on each collection

List of 99 poets
The following table lists (in alphabetical order) 99 poets who contributed to La Parnasse contemporain. Indicated for each poet is the number of poems that appeared in the three collections (1866, 1871, 1876):

French poetry